Vincent Lambert (20 September 1976 in Châteauroux – 11 July 2019 in Reims) was a French man who in 2008 fell into a persistent vegetative state after sustaining critical injuries in a road accident. He had been working as a psychiatric nurse  since 2000, and had been married since 2007 to a woman named Rachel, then a nursing student. After an 11-years legal battle between two opposed sides of his family (most prominently his widow, Rachel Lambert, willing to let him die according to the wishes he reportedly expressed prior to the accident — but never formalized into a written living will — and his mother, Viviane Lambert, determined to keep him alive, according to her strong Traditionalist Catholic convictions), the courts eventually allowed him to die through starvation in July 2019. Like the Terri Schiavo case in the United States, his case spurred highly publicized activism from the anti-abortion movement, the right-to-die movement, and disability rights groups, in France and French-speaking countries.

See also
 Terri Schiavo case (a similar case in the United States, wherein a woman remained in a persistent vegetative state for fifteen years)

References

Euthanasia activists
French nurses
1976 births
2019 deaths